In baseball, an assist (denoted by A) is a defensive statistic, baseball being one of the few sports in which the defensive team controls the ball. An assist is credited to every defensive player who fields or touches the ball (after it has been hit by the batter) prior to the recording of a putout, even if the contact was unintentional. For example, if a ball strikes a player's leg and bounces off him to another fielder, who tags the baserunner, the first player is credited with an assist. A fielder can receive a maximum of one assist per out recorded. An assist is also credited if a putout would have occurred, had another fielder not committed an error. For example, a second baseman might field a ground ball cleanly, but the first baseman might drop his throw. In this case, an error would be charged to the first baseman, and the second baseman would be credited with an assist. Unlike putouts, exactly one of which is awarded for every defensive out, an out can result in no assists being credited (as in strikeouts, fly outs and line drives), or in assists being credited to multiple players (as in relay throws and rundown plays). Shortstop, abbreviated SS, is a baseball or softball fielding position in the infield, commonly stationed between second and third base, which is considered to be among the most demanding defensive positions. The position is mostly filled by defensive specialists, so shortstops are generally relatively poor batters who typically hit lower in the batting order. In the numbering system used to record defensive plays, the shortstop is assigned the number 6.

Shortstops are most commonly credited with an assist when they field a ground ball and throw the ball either to the first baseman to retire the batter/runner, or to the second baseman or third baseman to force out a runner, perhaps beginning a double play. Other common ways in which shortstops gain an assist are by throwing out a runner attempting to score, perhaps on a relay throw from the left fielder, rundown plays in which a runner is stranded between bases, throwing out a runner attempting to steal third base on a pickoff throw, and throwing to second or third base after catching a line drive in order to retire a runner before they can tag up. Second basemen and shortstops typically accumulate far more assists than players at other positions due to the frequency of ground balls to the middle infielders; the top six major league players in career assists were all primarily shortstops, and 7,354 of Rabbit Maranville's record 8,967 career assists were earned as a shortstop.

As strikeout totals have risen in baseball, the frequency of other defensive outs including ground outs has declined; as a result, assist totals for shortstops have likewise declined, and only two of the top seven career leaders have been active since 1973. Through 2022, none of the top 21 single-season totals have been recorded since 1988, and only five of the top 120 since 1993. Ozzie Smith is the all-time leader in career assists as a shortstop with 8,375, the most by any player in major league history at any single position. Luis Aparicio (8,016) is the only other shortstop to record more than 8,000 career assists.

Key

List

Stats updated through the 2022 season

Other Hall of Famers

Notes

References

External links

Major League Baseball statistics
Putouts as a shortstop